The 2006 New York Mets season was the 45th regular season for the Mets. They went 97-65 and won the NL East, a feat the team would not repeat until 2015. They were managed by Willie Randolph. They played home games at Shea Stadium. They used the marketing slogan of "The Team. The Time. The Mets." throughout the season.

Offseason
November 18, 2005: Xavier Nady was traded by the San Diego Padres to the New York Mets for Mike Cameron.
November 24, 2005: Carlos Delgado was traded by the Florida Marlins with cash to the New York Mets for Mike Jacobs, Yusmeiro Petit, and Grant Psomas (minors).
November 29, 2005: Billy Wagner was signed as a free agent with the New York Mets.
December 5, 2005: Paul Lo Duca was traded by the Florida Marlins to the New York Mets for Dante Brinkley (minors) and Gaby Hernandez (minors).
December 12, 2005: Julio Franco was signed as a free agent with the New York Mets.
January 22, 2006: Kris Benson was traded by the New York Mets to the Baltimore Orioles for Jorge Julio and John Maine.

Regular season

Season standings

National League East

Record vs. opponents

Transactions
July 31, 2006: Xavier Nady was traded by the New York Mets to the Pittsburgh Pirates for Roberto Hernandez and Óliver Pérez.
August 8, 2006: Ricky Ledée was selected off waivers by the New York Mets from the Los Angeles Dodgers.
August 22, 2006: Shawn Green was traded by the Arizona Diamondbacks with cash to the New York Mets for Evan MacLane (minors).

Roster

Game log 

|- bgcolor="#cfc"
| 1 || April 3 || Nationals || 3–2 || Glavine (1–0) || Hernandez (0–1) || Wagner (1) || Shea Stadium || 54,371 || 1–0
|- bgcolor="#fcc"
| 2 || April 5 || Nationals || 5–9  || Cordero (1–0) || Julio (0–1) || — || Shea Stadium || 19,557 || 1–1
|- bgcolor="#cfc"
| 3 || April 6 || Nationals || 10–5 || Martinez (1–0) || Ortiz (0–1) || — || Shea Stadium || 25,839 || 2–1
|- bgcolor="#cfc"
| 4 || April 7 || Marlins || 9–3 || Trachsel (1–0) || Vargas (0–1) || — || Shea Stadium || 39,761 || 3–1
|- bgcolor="#ccc"
| – || April 8 || Marlins || colspan=8|Postponed (rain); rescheduled for July 8
|- bgcolor="#cfc"
| 5 || April 9 || Marlins || 3–2 || Wagner (1–0) || Martinez (0–1) || — || Shea Stadium || 55,255 || 4–1
|- bgcolor="#cfc"
| 6 || April 11 || @ Nationals || 7–1 || Bannister (1–0) || Ortiz (0–2) || — || RFK Stadium || 40,530 || 5–1
|- bgcolor="#cfc"
| 7 || April 12 || @ Nationals || 3–1 || Martinez (2–0) || Armas (0–2) || Wagner (2) || RFK Stadium || 29,985 || 6–1
|- bgcolor="#cfc"
| 8 || April 13 || @ Nationals || 13–4 || Zambrano (1–0) || Hernandez (1–2) || — || RFK Stadium || 25,465 || 7–1
|- bgcolor="#cfc"
| 9 || April 14 || Brewers || 4–3 || Glavine (2–0) || Capuano (1–2) || Wagner (3) || Shea Stadium || 37,489 || 8–1
|- bgcolor="#fcc"
| 10 || April 15 || Brewers || 2–8 || Ohka (1–1) || Trachsel (1–1) || — || Shea Stadium || 55,831 || 8–2
|- bgcolor="#cfc"
| 11 || April 16 || Brewers || 9–3 || Bannister (2–0) || Sheets (0–1) || — || Shea Stadium || 38,119 || 9–2
|- bgcolor="#cfc"
| 12 || April 17 || Braves || 4–3 || Martinez (3–0) || Sosa (0–3) || Wagner (4) || Shea Stadium || 36,867 || 10–2
|- bgcolor="#fcc"
| 13 || April 18 || Braves || 1–7 || Davies (1–1) || Zambrano (1–1) || — || Shea Stadium || 30,322 || 10–3
|- bgcolor="#fcc"
| 14 || April 19 || Braves || 1–2 || Hudson (1–1) || Glavine (2–1) || — || Shea Stadium || 40,861 || 10–4
|- bgcolor="#cfc"
| 15 || April 20 || @ Padres || 7–2 || Sanchez (1–0) || Linebrink (1–2) || — || Petco Park || 28,791 || 11–4
|- bgcolor="#fcc"
| 16 || April 21 || @ Padres || 1–2  || Sweeney (1–0) || Bradford (0–1) || — || Petco Park || 38,541 || 11–5
|- bgcolor="#cfc"
| 17 || April 22 || @ Padres || 8–1 || Martinez (4–0) || Young (2–1) || — || Petco Park || 39,389 || 12–5
|- bgcolor="#fcc"
| 18 || April 23 || @ Padres || 4–7 || Hensley (1–1) || Zambrano (1–2) || Hoffman (3) || Petco Park || 34,109 || 12–6
|- bgcolor="#fcc"
| 19 || April 24 || @ Giants || 2–6 || Cain (1–2) || Glavine (2–2) || — || AT&T Park || 36,855 || 12–7
|- bgcolor="#cfc"
| 20 || April 25 || @ Giants || 4–1 || Trachsel (2–1) || Wright (2–1) || Wagner (5) || AT&T Park || 35,775 || 13–7
|- bgcolor="#cfc"
| 21 || April 26 || @ Giants || 9–7  || Oliver (1–0) || Munter (0–1) || — || AT&T Park || 34,454 || 14–7
|- bgcolor="#cfc"
| 22 || April 28 || @ Braves || 5–2 || Martinez (5–0) || Smoltz (1–2) || Wagner (6) || Turner Field || 45,389 || 15–7
|- bgcolor="#cfc"
| 23 || April 29 || @ Braves || 1–0 || Glavine (3–2) || Thomson (0–1) || Wagner (7) || Turner Field || 46,387 || 16–7
|- bgcolor="#fcc"
| 24 || April 30 || @ Braves || 5–8 || Davies (2–2) || Trachsel (2–2) || Reitsma (5) || Turner Field || 35,245 || 16–8
|-

 
|- bgcolor="#cfc"
| 25 || May 1 || Nationals || 2–1 || Wagner (2–0) || Majewski (1–2) || — || Shea Stadium || 28,310 || 17–8
|- bgcolor="#fcc"
| 26 || May 2 || Nationals || 2–6 || O'Connor (1–0) || Maine (0–1) || — || Shea Stadium || 34,046 || 17–9
|- bgcolor="#cfc"
| 27 || May 3 || Pirates || 4–3  || Bradford (1–1) || Gonzalez (0–2) || — || Shea Stadium || 33,668 || 18–9
|- bgcolor="#cfc"
| 28 || May 4 || Pirates || 6–0 || Glavine (4–2) || Maholm (1–4) || — || Shea Stadium || 30,756 || 19–9
|- bgcolor="#cfc"
| 29 || May 5 || Braves || 8–7  || Julio (1–1) || Sosa (0–5) || — || Shea Stadium || 47,720 || 20–9
|- bgcolor="#cfc"
| 30 || May 6 || Braves || 6–5 || Fortunato (1–0) || Hudson (2–3) || Julio (1) || Shea Stadium || 48,369 || 21–9
|- bgcolor="#fcc"
| 31 || May 7 || Braves || 3–13 || Smoltz (2–2) || Lima (0–1) || — || Shea Stadium || 48,100 || 21–10
|- bgcolor="#fcc"
| 32 || May 9 || @ Phillies || 4–5 || Gordon (2–1) || Heilman (0–1) || — || Citizens Bank Park || 33,787 || 21–11
|- bgcolor="#cfc"
| 33 || May 10 || @ Phillies || 13–2 || Glavine (5–2) || Lidle (3–4) || — || Citizens Bank Park || 30,269 || 22–11
|- bgcolor="#fcc"
| 34 || May 11 || @ Phillies || 0–2  || Floyd (4–2) || Trachsel (2–3) || — || Citizens Bank Park || 28,224 || 22–12
|- bgcolor="#fcc"
| 35 || May 12 || @ Brewers || 6–9 || Bush (3–4) || Lima (0–2) || Turnbow (12) || Miller Park || 26,362 || 22–13
|- bgcolor="#cfc"
| 36 || May 13 || @ Brewers || 9–8 || Bradford (2–1) || Turnbow (0–1) || Wagner (8) || Miller Park || 45,150 || 23–13
|- bgcolor="#fcc"
| 37 || May 14 || @ Brewers || 5–6  || de la Rosa (2–0) || Bradford (2–2) || — || Miller Park || 28,104 || 23–14
|- bgcolor="#cfc"
| 38 || May 16 || @ Cardinals || 8–3 || Glavine (6–2) || Suppan (4–3) || — || Busch Stadium || 39,616 || 24–14
|- bgcolor="#fcc"
| 39 || May 17 || @ Cardinals || 0–1 || Mulder (5–1) || Trachsel (2–4) || Isringhausen (12) || Busch Stadium || 40,573 || 24–15
|- bgcolor="#fcc"
| 40 || May 18 || @ Cardinals || 3–6 || Marquis (5–4) || Lima (0–3) || Isringhausen (13) || Busch Stadium || 41,273 || 24–16
|- bgcolor="#cfc"
| 41 || May 19 || Yankees || 7–6 || Wagner (3–0) || Rivera (1–3) || — || Shea Stadium || 56,289 || 25–16
|- bgcolor="#fcc"
| 42 || May 20 || Yankees || 4–5  || Rivera (2–3) || Julio (1–2) || — || Shea Stadium || 56,185 || 25–17
|- bgcolor="#cfc"
| 43 || May 21 || Yankees || 4–3 || Glavine (7–2) || Small (0–2) || Wagner (9) || Shea Stadium || 56,205 || 26–17
|- bgcolor="#cfc"
| 44 || May 23 || Phillies || 9–8  || Oliver (2–0) || Madson (4–3) || — || Shea Stadium || 28,958 || 27–17
|- bgcolor="#cfc"
| 45 || May 24 || Phillies || 5–4 || Feliciano (1–0) || Cormier (2–1) || Wagner (10) || Shea Stadium || 32,094 || 28–17
|- bgcolor="#fcc"
| 46 || May 25 || Phillies || 3–5 || Myers (3–2) || Feliciano (1–1) || Gordon (14) || Shea Stadium || 51,365 || 28–18
|- bgcolor="#fcc"
| 47 || May 26 || @ Marlins || 1–5 || Johnson (4–2) || Martinez (5–1) || — || Dolphins Stadium || 15,338 || 28–19
|- bgcolor="#cfc"
| 48 || May 27 || @ Marlins || 7–4 || Glavine (8–2) || Willis (1–6) || Wagner (11) || Dolphins Stadium || 13,037 || 29–19
|- bgcolor="#cfc"
| 49 || May 28 || @ Marlins || 7–3 || Hernandez (3–4) || Nolasco (3–2) || — || Dolphins Stadium || 17,488 || 30–19
|- bgcolor="#cfc"
| 50 || May 29 || Diamondbacks || 8–7 || Sanchez (2–0) || Valverde (2–3) || — || Shea Stadium || 39,826 || 31–19
|- bgcolor="#fcc"
| 51 || May 30 || Diamondbacks || 2–7 || Batista (5–2) || Soler (0–1) || — || Shea Stadium || 35,448 || 31–20
|- bgcolor="#cfc"
| 52 || May 31 || Diamondbacks || 1–0  || Sanchez (3–0) || Grimsley (1–2) || — || Shea Stadium || 37,735 || 32–20
|-

|- bgcolor="#ccc"
| – || June 2 || Giants || colspan=8|Postponed (rain); rescheduled for June 3
|- bgcolor="#fcc"
| 53 || June 3  || Giants || 4–6 || Cain (4–5) || Hernandez (3–5) || Benitez (4) || Shea Stadium || N/A || 32–21
|- bgcolor="#cfc"
| 54 || June 3  || Giants || 3–2  || Sanchez (4–0) || Wilson (0–1) || — || Shea Stadium || 45,576 || 33–21
|- bgcolor="#fcc"
| 55 || June 4 || Giants || 6–7  || Sanchez (1–0) || Feliciano (1–2) || Accardo (1) || Shea Stadium || 48,791 || 33–22
|- bgcolor="#cfc"
| 56 || June 5 || @ Dodgers || 4–1 || Soler (1–1) || Tomko (5–4) || Bradford (1) || Dodger Stadium || 34,420 || 34–22
|- bgcolor="#fcc"
| 57 || June 6 || @ Dodgers || 5–8 || Lowe (5–3) || Martinez (5–2) || Gagne (1) || Dodger Stadium || 46,347 || 34–23
|- bgcolor="#cfc"
| 58 || June 7 || @ Dodgers || 9–7 || Glavine (9–2) || Perez (4–2) || Wagner (12) || Dodger Stadium || 44,230 || 35–23
|- bgcolor="#cfc"
| 59 || June 8 || @ Diamondbacks || 7–1 || Hernandez (4–5) || Vargas (6–3) || — || Chase Field || 20,845 || 36–23
|- bgcolor="#cfc"
| 60 || June 9 || @ Diamondbacks || 10–6 || Trachsel (3–4) || Batista (6–3) || — || Chase Field || 23,671 || 37–23
|- bgcolor="#cfc"
| 61 || June 10 || @ Diamondbacks || 5–0 || Soler (2–1) || Webb (8–1) || — || Chase Field || 33,671 || 38–23
|- bgcolor="#cfc"
| 62 || June 11 || @ Diamondbacks || 15–2 || Martinez (6–2) || Ortiz (0–5) || — || Chase Field || 28,475 || 39–23
|- bgcolor="#cfc"
| 63 || June 13 || @ Phillies || 9–7 || Bradford (3–2) || Madson (6–4) || Wagner (13) || Citizens Bank Park || 37,964 || 40–23
|- bgcolor="#cfc"
| 64 || June 14 || @ Phillies || 9–3 || Oliver (3–0) || Myers (4–3) || — || Citizens Bank Park || 38,811 || 41–23
|- bgcolor="#cfc"
| 65 || June 15 || @ Phillies || 5–4 || Trachsel (4–4) || Lidle (4–6) || Wagner (14) || Citizens Bank Park || 45,102 || 42–23
|- bgcolor="#fcc"
| 66 || June 16 || Orioles || 3–6 || Bedard (6–6) || Heilman (0–2) || Ray (17) || Shea Stadium || 45,967 || 42–24
|- bgcolor="#fcc"
| 67 || June 17 || Orioles || 2–4 || Benson (8–5) || Martinez (6–3) || Ray (18) || Shea Stadium || 52,320 || 42–25
|- bgcolor="#cfc"
| 68 || June 18 || Orioles || 9–4 || Glavine (10–2) || Loewen (0–2) || — || Shea Stadium || 43,393 || 43–25
|- bgcolor="#fcc"
| 69 || June 19 || Reds || 2–4 || Arroyo (9–3) || Hernandez (4–6) || — || Shea Stadium || 41,874 || 43–26
|- bgcolor="#cfc"
| 70 || June 20 || Reds || 9–2 || Trachsel (5–4) || Ramirez (2–6) || — || Shea Stadium || 38,991 || 44–26
|- bgcolor="#fcc"
| 71 || June 21 || Reds || 5–6 || Standridge (1–0) || Wagner (3–1) || Coffey (5) || Shea Stadium || 49,758 || 44–27
|- bgcolor="#cfc"
| 72 || June 22 || Reds || 6–2 || Martinez (7–3) || Milton (4–4) || Bradford (2) || Shea Stadium || 46,767 || 45–27
|- bgcolor="#cfc"
| 73 || June 23 || @ Blue Jays || 6–1 || Glavine (11–2) || Janssen (5–6) || — || Rogers Centre || 28,507 || 46–27
|- bgcolor="#fcc"
| 74 || June 24 || @ Blue Jays || 4–7 || Halladay (9–2) || Hernandez (4–7) || Ryan (21) || Rogers Centre || 31,327 || 46–28
|- bgcolor="#cfc"
| 75 || June 25 || @ Blue Jays || 7–4 || Trachsel (6–4) || Towers (1–9) || Wagner (15) || Rogers Centre || 32,277 || 47–28
|- bgcolor="#fcc"
| 76 || June 27 || @ Red Sox || 4–9 || Lester (3–0) || Soler (2–2) || — || Fenway Park || 36,250 || 47–29
|- bgcolor="#fcc"
| 77 || June 28 || @ Red Sox || 2–10 || Beckett (10–3) || Martinez (7–4) || — || Fenway Park || 36,035 || 47–30
|- bgcolor="#fcc"
| 78 || June 29 || @ Red Sox || 2–4 || Schilling (10–2) || Heilman (0–3) || Papelbon (24) || Fenway Park || 36,028 || 47–31
|- bgcolor="#fcc"
| 79 || June 30 || @ Yankees || 0–2 || Villone (2–1) || Hernandez (4–8) || Rivera (18) || Yankee Stadium || 55,245 || 47–32
|-

 
|- bgcolor="#cfc"
| 80 || July 1 || @ Yankees || 8–3 || Trachsel (7–4) || Johnson (9–7) || — || Yankee Stadium || 55,132 || 48–32
|- bgcolor="#fcc"
| 81 || July 2 || @ Yankees || 7–16 || Villone (3–1) || Soler (2–3) || — || Yankee Stadium || 55,212 || 48–33
|- bgcolor="#fcc"
| 82 || July 3 || Pirates || 1–11 || Maholm (3–7) || Maine (0–2) || — || Shea Stadium || 54,111 || 48–34
|- bgcolor="#cfc"
| 83 || July 4 || Pirates || 7–6 || Sanchez (5–0) || R. Hernandez (0–2) || Wagner (16) || Shea Stadium || 38,487 || 49–34
|- bgcolor="#cfc"
| 84 || July 5 || Pirates || 5–0 || O. Hernandez (5–8) || Wells (0–4) || — || Shea Stadium || 40,360 || 50–34
|- bgcolor="#cfc"
| 85 || July 6 || Pirates || 7–5 || Trachsel (8–4) || Gorzelanny (0–1) || Wagner (17) || Shea Stadium || 39,743 || 51–34
|- bgcolor="#fcc"
| 86 || July 7 || Marlins || 3–7 || Willis (6–7) || Lima (0–4) || — || Shea Stadium || 41,276 || 51–35
|- bgcolor="#fcc"
| 87 || July 8  || Marlins || 2–3 || Johnson (8–4) || Maine (0–3) || Borowski (16) || Shea Stadium || N/A || 51–36
|- bgcolor="#cfc"
| 88 || July 8  || Marlins || 17–3 || Pelfrey (1–0) || Nolasco (6–6) || — || Shea Stadium || 41,477 || 52–36
|- bgcolor="#cfc"
| 89 || July 9 || Marlins || 7–6 || Feliciano (2–2) || Kensing (1–2) || Wagner (18) || Shea Stadium || 39,829 || 53–36
|- bgcolor="#bbcaff" 
| colspan=10 | 77th All-Star Game in Pittsburgh, Pennsylvania
|- bgcolor="#cfc"
| 90 || July 14 || @ Cubs || 6–3 || Trachsel (9–4) || Maddux (7–10) || — || Wrigley Field || 40,782 || 54–36
|- bgcolor="#fcc"
| 91 || July 15 || @ Cubs || 2–9 || Zambrano (9–3) || Glavine (11–3) || — || Wrigley Field || 41,368 || 54–37
|- bgcolor="#cfc"
| 92 || July 16 || @ Cubs || 13–7 || Feliciano (3–2) || Marshall (5–8) || — || Wrigley Field || 40,157 || 55–37
|- bgcolor="#cfc"
| 93 || July 18 || @ Reds || 8–3 || Pelfrey (2–0) || Milton (6–5) || — || Great American Ball Park || 27,138 || 56–37
|- bgcolor="#fcc"
| 94 || July 19 || @ Reds || 4–7 || Coffey (5–4) || Sanchez (5–1) || Guardado (9) || Great American Ball Park || 26,300 || 56–38
|- bgcolor="#cfc"
| 95 || July 20 || @ Reds || 4–2  || Feliciano (4–2) || Majewski (3–3) || Wagner (19) || Great American Ball Park || 28,729 || 57–38
|- bgcolor="#cfc"
| 96 || July 21 || Astros || 7–0 || Maine (1–3) || Buchholz (6–8) || — || Shea Stadium || 46,228 || 58–38
|- bgcolor="#cfc"
| 97 || July 22 || Astros || 4–3 || O. Hernandez (6–8) || Backe (1–1) || Wagner (20) || Shea Stadium || 46,574 || 59–38
|- bgcolor="#fcc"
| 98 || July 23 || Astros || 4–8 || Oswalt (7–7) || Pelfrey (2–1) || — || Shea Stadium || 46,375 || 59–39
|- bgcolor="#fcc"
| 99 || July 24 || Cubs || 7–8 || Maddux (8–11) || Trachsel (9–5) || Dempster (17) || Shea Stadium || 45,631 || 59–40
|- bgcolor="#fcc"
| 100 || July 25 || Cubs || 6–8 || Zambrano (11–3) || Glavine (11–4) || Howry (3) || Shea Stadium || 47,686 || 59–41
|- bgcolor="#cfc"
| 101 || July 26 || Cubs || 1–0  || Heilman (1–3) || Rusch (3–8) || — || Shea Stadium || 40,299 || 60–41
|- bgcolor="#cfc"
| 102 || July 28 || @ Braves || 6–4 || Martinez (8–4) || Ramirez (5–4) || Wagner (21) || Turner Field || 53,943 || 61–41
|- bgcolor="#cfc"
| 103 || July 29 || @ Braves || 11–3 || O. Hernandez (7–8) || Hudson (8–9) || — || Turner Field || 49,047 || 62–41
|- bgcolor="#cfc"
| 104 || July 30 || @ Braves || 10–6 || Oliver (4–0) || James (4–2) || Wagner (22) || Turner Field || 40,526 || 63–41
|-

|- bgcolor="#fcc"
| 105 || August 1 || @ Marlins || 5–6 || Herges (1–2) || Wagner (3–2) || — || Dolphins Stadium || 16,641 || 63–42
|- bgcolor="#cfc"
| 106 || August 2 || @ Marlins || 6–5 || Trachsel (10–5) || Nolasco (9–7) || Wagner (23) || Dolphins Stadium || 18,239 || 64–42
|- bgcolor="#fcc"
| 107 || August 3 || @ Marlins || 1–4 || Willis (7–8) || Heilman (1–4) || Borowski (22) || Dolphins Stadium || 24,097 || 64–43
|- bgcolor="#fcc"
| 108 || August 4 || Phillies || 3–5 || Madson (10–7) || Oliver (4–1) || Gordon (27) || Shea Stadium || 43,209 || 64–44
|- bgcolor="#cfc"
| 109 || August 5 || Phillies || 4–3 || Glavine (12–4) || Lieber (4–9) || Wagner (24) || Shea Stadium || 44,829 || 65–44
|- bgcolor="#cfc"
| 110 || August 6 || Phillies || 8–1 || Maine (2–3) || Mathieson (1–3) || — || Shea Stadium || 39,144 || 66–44
|- bgcolor="#cfc"
| 111 || August 8 || Padres || 3–2 || Trachsel (11–5) || W. Williams (4–4) || Wagner (25) || Shea Stadium || 46,167 || 67–44
|- bgcolor="#cfc"
| 112 || August 9 || Padres || 4–3 || Martinez (9–4) || Hensley (7–9) || Wagner (26) || Shea Stadium || 49,979 || 68–44
|- bgcolor="#cfc"
| 113 || August 10 || Padres || 7–3 || Hernandez (8–8) || Brocail (2–1) || — || Shea Stadium || 39,649 || 69–44
|- bgcolor="#fcc"
| 114 || August 11 || @ Nationals || 1–2 || Traber (2–1) || Glavine (12–5) || Cordero (21) || RFK Stadium || 29,414 || 69–45
|- bgcolor="#cfc"
| 115 || August 12 || @ Nationals || 6–4 || Feliciano (5–2) || Schroder (0–1) || Wagner (27) || RFK Stadium || 42,507 || 70–45
|- bgcolor="#cfc"
| 116 || August 13 || @ Nationals || 3–1 || Bradford (4–2) || Rauch (3–3) || Wagner (28) || RFK Stadium || 37,732 || 71–45
|- bgcolor="#fcc"
| 117 || August 14 || @ Phillies || 0–13 || Hamels (5–6) || Martinez (9–5) || — || Citizens Bank Park || 36,888 || 71–46
|- bgcolor="#fcc"
| 118 || August 15 || @ Phillies || 4–11 || Wolf (1–0) || Hernandez (8–9) || — || Citizens Bank Park || 40,283 || 71–47
|- bgcolor="#fcc"
| 119 || August 16 || @ Phillies || 0–3 || Lieber (5–9) || Glavine (12–6) || — || Citizens Bank Park || 42,156 || 71–48
|- bgcolor="#cfc"
| 120 || August 17 || @ Phillies || 7–2 || Maine (3–3) || Mathieson (1–4) || — || Citizens Bank Park || 45,775 || 72–48
|- bgcolor="#cfc"
| 121 || August 18 || Rockies || 6–3 || Trachsel (12–5) || Kim (7–8) || Wagner (29) || Shea Stadium || 35,325 || 73–48
|- bgcolor="#cfc"
| 122 || August 19 || Rockies || 7–4 || Heilman (2–4) || Francis (9–10) || Wagner (30) || Shea Stadium || 55,085 || 74–48
|- bgcolor="#cfc"
| 123 || August 20 || Rockies || 2–0 || Hernandez (9–9) || Jennings (7–10) || Wagner (31) || Shea Stadium || 40,654 || 75–48
|- bgcolor="#cfc"
| 124 || August 22 || Cardinals || 8–7 || Heilman (3–4) || Isringhausen (4–7) || — || Shea Stadium || 49,661 || 76–48
|- bgcolor="#cfc"
| 125 || August 23 || Cardinals || 10–8 || Trachsel (13–5) || Mulder (6–6) || Wagner (32) || Shea Stadium || 49,329 || 77–48
|- bgcolor="#cfc"
| 126 || August 24 || Cardinals || 6–2 || D. Williams (3–3) || Marquis (13–12) || — || Shea Stadium || 45,497 || 78–48
|- bgcolor="#fcc"
| 127 || August 25 || Phillies || 3–4 || Wolf (3–0) || Bannister (2–1) || Madson (2) || Shea Stadium || 41,707 || 78–49
|- bgcolor="#cfc"
| 128 || August 26 || Phillies || 11–5 || Feliciano (6–2) || White (2–1) || — || Shea Stadium || 47,019 || 79–49
|- bgcolor="#ccc"
| – || August 27 || Phillies || colspan=8|Postponed (rain); rescheduled for August 28
|- bgcolor="#cfc"
| 129 || August 28 || Phillies || 8–3 || Maine (4–3) || Moyer (7–13) || — || Shea Stadium || 45,868 || 80–49
|- bgcolor="#cfc"
| 130 || August 29 || @ Rockies || 10–5 || Trachsel (13–5) || Kim (7–10) || — || Coors Field || 23,454 || 81–49
|- bgcolor="#cfc"
| 131 || August 30 || @ Rockies || 11–3 || D. Williams (4–3) || Fogg (9–9) || — || Coors Field || 22,945 || 82–49
|- bgcolor="#fcc"
| 132 || August 31 || @ Rockies || 4–8 || Francis (11–10) || Perez (2–11) || — || Coors Field || 23,273 || 82–50
|-

|- bgcolor="#cfc"
| 133 || September 1 || @ Astros || 8–7 || Mota (2–3) || Springer (1–1) || Wagner (33) || Minute Maid Park || 35,548 || 83–50
|- bgcolor="#cfc"
| 134 || September 2 || @ Astros || 4–2 || Maine (5–3) || Hirsh (2–3) || Wagner (34) || Minute Maid Park || 43,218 || 84–50
|- bgcolor="#fcc"
| 135 || September 3 || @ Astros || 1–2 || Oswalt (11–8) || Hernandez (9–10) || Lidge (29) || Minute Maid Park || 43,018 || 84–51
|- bgcolor="#fcc"
| 136 || September 4 || Braves || 0–5 || James (8–3) || Trachsel (14–6) || — || Shea Stadium || 42,428 || 84–52
|- bgcolor="#ccc"
| – || September 5 || Braves || colspan=8|Postponed (rain); rescheduled for September 6
|- bgcolor="#cfc"6
| 137 || September 6  || Braves || 4–1 || Williams (5–3) || Smoltz (12–8) || Wagner (35) || Shea Stadium || N/A || 85–52
|- bgcolor="#cfc"
| 138 || September 6  || Braves || 8–0 || O. Perez (3–11) || Davies (2–5) || — || Shea Stadium || 40,536 || 86–52
|- bgcolor="#cfc"
| 139 || September 7 || Dodgers || 7–0 || Glavine (13–6) || Penny (15–8) || — || Shea Stadium || 48,583 || 87–52
|- bgcolor="#fcc"
| 140 || September 8 || Dodgers || 0–5 || Kuo (1–4) || Maine (5–4) || — || Shea Stadium || 52,077 || 87–53
|- bgcolor="#cfc"
| 141 || September 9 || Dodgers || 3–2 || Hernandez (10–10) || Maddux (12–13) || Wagner (36) || Shea Stadium || 47,062 || 88–53
|- bgcolor="#fcc"
| 142 || September 10 || Dodgers || 1–9 || Stults (1–0) || Trachsel (14–7) || — || Shea Stadium || 48,760 || 88–54
|- bgcolor="#fcc"
| 143 || September 11 || @ Marlins || 5–16 || Sanchez (8–2) || Williams (5–4) || — || Dolphins Stadium || 13,725 || 88–55
|- bgcolor="#cfc"
| 144 || September 12 || @ Marlins || 6–4 || Mota (3–3) || Resop (1–1) || Wagner (37) || Dolphins Stadium || 15,163 || 89–55
|- bgcolor="#cfc"
| 145 || September 13 || @ Marlins || 7–4  || Heilman (4–4) || Herges (1–3) || Wagner (38) || Dolphins Stadium || 20,225 || 90–55
|- bgcolor="#fcc"
| 146 || September 15 || @ Pirates || 3–5 || Maholm (8–10) || Martinez (9–6) || Torres (8) || PNC Park || 24,410 || 90–56
|- bgcolor="#fcc"
| 147 || September 16 || @ Pirates || 2–3 || Capps (8–1) || Heilman (4–5) || — || PNC Park || 37,623 || 90–57
|- bgcolor="#fcc"
| 148 || September 17 || @ Pirates || 0–3 || Duke (10–13) || Maine (5–5) || Torres (9) || PNC Park || 34,866 || 90–58
|- bgcolor="#cfc"
| 149 || September 18 || Marlins || 4–0 || Trachsel (15–7) || Moehler (7–9) || — || Shea Stadium || 46,729 || 91–58
|- bgcolor="#cfc"
| 150 || September 19 || Marlins || 3–2 || Glavine (14–6) || Resop (1–2) || Wagner (39) || Shea Stadium || 42,407 || 92–58
|- bgcolor="#fcc"
| 151 || September 20 || Marlins || 3–6 || Willis (12–11) || O. Perez (3–12) || Borowski (35) || Shea Stadium || 37,911 || 92–59
|- bgcolor="#fcc"
| 152 || September 21 || Marlins || 2–5 || Sanchez (9–3) || Martinez (9–7) || Borowski (36) || Shea Stadium || 44,966 || 92–60
|- bgcolor="#fcc"
| 153 || September 22 || Nationals || 2–3 || Astacio (5–5) || Hernandez (10–11) || Cordero (28) || Shea Stadium || 42,788 || 92–61
|- bgcolor="#cfc"
| 154 || September 23 || Nationals || 12–6 || Maine (6–5) || O'Connor (3–8) || — || Shea Stadium || 45,247 || 93–61
|- bgcolor="#fcc"
| 155 || September 24 || Nationals || 1–5 || Armas (9–12) || Trachsel (15–8) || — || Shea Stadium || 44,543 || 93–62
|- bgcolor="#fcc"
| 156 || September 25 || Nationals || 3–7 || B. Perez (2–0) || Glavine (14–7) || — || Shea Stadium || 34,027 || 93–63
|- bgcolor="#fcc"
| 157 || September 26 || @ Braves || 0–12 || Smoltz (15–9) || O. Perez (3–13) || — || Turner Field || 22,607 || 93–64
|- bgcolor="#fcc"
| 158 || September 27 || @ Braves || 1–13 ||  Hudson (13–12) || Martinez (9–8) || — || Turner Field || 23,177 || 93–65
|- bgcolor="#cfc"
| 159 || September 28 || @ Braves || 7–4 || Hernandez (11–11) || Davies (3–7) || — || Turner Field || 22,944 || 94–65
|- bgcolor="#cfc"
| 160 || September 29 || @ Nationals || 4–3 || Feliciano (7–2) || Rauch (4–5) || Wagner (40) || RFK Stadium || 27,805 || 95–65
|- bgcolor="#cfc"
| 161 || September 30 || @ Nationals || 13–0 || Glavine (15–7) || B. Perez (2–1) || — || RFK Stadium || 30,449 || 96–65
|-

|- bgcolor="#cfc"
| 162 || October 1 || @ Nationals || 6–2 || Mota (4–3) || Ortiz (11–16) || — || RFK Stadium || 29,044 || 97–65
|-

Player stats

Batting

Starters by position
Note: Pos = Position; G = Games played; AB = At bats; H = Hits; Avg. = Batting average; HR = Home runs; RBI = Runs batted in

Other batters
Note: G = Games played; AB = At bats; H = Hits; Avg. = Batting average; HR = Home runs; RBI = Runs batted in

Pitching

 Starting pitchers 
Note: G = Games pitched; IP = Innings pitched; W = Wins; L = Losses; ERA = Earned run average; SO = Strikeouts

 Other pitchers 
Note: G = Games pitched; IP = Innings pitched; W = Wins; L = Losses; ERA = Earned run average; SO = Strikeouts

 Relief pitchers 
Note: G = Games pitched; W = Wins; L = Losses; SV = Saves; ERA = Earned run average; SO = Strikeouts

Playoffs
 Game log 

|- bgcolor=#cfc
| 1 || October 4 || Dodgers || 6–5 || Mota (1–0) || Penny (0–1) || Wagner (1) || Shea Stadium || 56,979 || 1–0
|- bgcolor=#cfc
| 2 || October 5 || Dodgers || 4–1 || Glavine (1–0) || Kuo (0–1) || Wagner (2) || Shea Stadium || 57,029 || 2–0
|- bgcolor=#cfc
| 3 || October 7 || @ Dodgers || 9–5 || Feliciano (1–0) || Broxton (0–1) || — || Dodger Stadium || 56,293 || 3–0
|-

|- bgcolor=#ccc
| – || October 11 || Cardinals || colspan=8| Postponed (rain); rescheduled for October 13
|- bgcolor=#cfc
| 1 || October 12 || Cardinals || 2–0 || Glavine (1–0) || Weaver (0–1) || Wagner (1) || Shea Stadium || 56,311 || 1–0
|- bgcolor=#fcc
| 2 || October 13 || Cardinals || 6–9 || Kinney (1–0) || Wagner (0–1) || — || Shea Stadium || 56,349 || 1–1
|- bgcolor=#fcc
| 3 || October 14 || @ Cardinals || 0–5 || Suppan (1–0) || Trachsel (0–1) || — || Busch Stadium || 47,053 || 1–2
|- bgcolor=#cfc
| 4 || October 15 || @ Cardinals || 12–5 || Perez (1–0) || Thompson (0–1) || — || Busch Stadium || 46,600 || 2–2
|- bgcolor=#ccc
| – || October 16 || @ Cardinals || colspan=8| Postponed (rain); rescheduled for October 17
|- bgcolor=#fcc
| 5 || October 17 || @ Cardinals || 2–4 || Weaver (1–1) || Glavine (1–1) || Wainwright (1) || Busch Stadium || 46,496 || 2–3
|- bgcolor=#cfc
| 6 || October 18 || Cardinals || 4–2 || Maine (1–0) || Carpenter (0–1) || — || Shea Stadium || 56,334 || 3–3
|- bgcolor=#fcc
| 7 || October 19 || Cardinals || 1–3 || Flores (1–0) || Heilman (0–1) || Wainwright (2) || Shea Stadium''' || 56,357 || 3–4
|-

Awards and honors
Carlos Delgado, Roberto Clemente Award

Farm system

LEAGUE CHAMPIONS: St. Lucie

References

External links
2006 New York Mets at Baseball Reference
2006 New York Mets team page at www.baseball-almanac.com

New York Mets seasons
New York Mets
National League East champion seasons
New York Mets
2000s in Queens